This is a list of theatres in Hobart in Tasmania, Australia. The Hobart City Centre has several theatres in continuous operation, including live theatre venues, picture theatres, a single multiplex operated by Village Cinemas, as well as several former theatres that are currently inoperable or demolished.

See also
List of drive-in theatres in Australia
List of theatres in Melbourne

References

Hobart-related lists
Buildings and structures in Hobart
Lists of cinemas
Lists of theatres by city

Hobart